The Americas Zone is one of the three zones of regional Davis Cup competition in 2007.

In the Americas Zone there are three different groups in which teams compete against each other to advance to the next group.

Participating nations

Draw

Venezuela relegated to Group II in 2008.
Peru and Brazil advance to World Group Play-off.

First round

Peru vs. Venezuela

Canada vs. Colombia

Second round

Peru vs. Mexico

Brazil vs. Canada

First round playoffs

Mexico vs. Venezuela

Second round playoffs

Venezuela vs. Colombia

References
Draw

Americas Zone Group I
Davis Cup Americas Zone